Supercar Challenge or Supercars Challenge may refer to:

 Supercars Challenge (event) - The non-championship races for Supercars Championship previously held at the Australian Grand Prix
 Supercar Challenge (series) - A Benelux motor racing series formerly known as the Dutch Supercar Challenge
 Supercar Challenge (video game) - A 2009 simulation racing video game for PlayStation 3 
 V8 Supercar Challenge - a former V8 Supercars event supporting the Gold Coast Indy 300
 Car and Driver Supercar Challenge, annual event held by magazine Car and Driver

See also
 Bathurst 250, known from 2001 to 2004 as the Konica V8 Supercar Challenge
 Supercars Championship, Australian touring car race championship
 Supercar Street Challenge (2001 videogame)